Alan Elliott may refer to:
Alan Elliott (1925–2006), Australian rules footballer
Allan Elliott McDonald (1903–1957), Australian politician
Alan Elliott, film producer of Amazing Grace